Giuseppe Maria Sciacca (Messina, 1912 — Palermo, 1995) was an Italian philosopher and academic. A student and assistant of Antonio Renda, Sciacca's work focused on Kantianism.

Professor Emeritus of History of Philosophy of the Faculty of Arts of the University of Palermo, he was president of the Italian Philosophical Society. He expressed and exposed his philosophical thought through a number of written works.

Bibliography

Written works
Filosofi che si confessano, Guido D'anna editore, Messina (1896)
Il fondamento della sterēsis nella "Filosofia dell'azione", Accademia di Scienze, Lettere ed Arti, Palermo (1949)
Il concetto di tiranno, dai greci a Coluccio Salutati, U. Manfredi editore Palermo (1953)
La visione della vita nell'Umanesimo e Coluccio Salutati, Palermo (1953)
Politica e vita spirituale, ed. Palumbo, Palermo (1953)
Gli Dei in Protagora, ed. Palumbo, Palermo (1958)
Esistenza e realtà in Husserl, ed. Palumbo, Palermo (1960)
Esistenza e realtà, Palermo (1962)
L'Idea della libertà in Kant. Fondamento della coscienza etico-politica, ed. Palumbo, Palermo (1963)
Scetticismo cristiano, ed. Palumbo, Palermo (1962)
Ritorno alla saggezza, ed. Palumbo, Palermo (1971)
L'uomo senza Adamo, ed. Palumbo, Palermo (1976)
Sapere e alienazione, ed. Palumbo, Palermo (1981)
Il Segno, quel Segno, ed. Cappelli, Bologna (1987)

References 

Caterina Genna, «Antonio Renda e Giuseppe Maria Sciacca: due testimoni della tradizione neokantiana», Palermo
Piero di Giovanni, Le avanguardie della filosofia italiana nel XX secolo, FrancoAngeli, 2002   (pp. 38–46)
"Bollettino quadrimestrale della Società Filosofica Italiana", nuova serie, n. 178, gennaio-aprile 2003:
 Piero Di Giovanni, L'opera e il pensiero di Giuseppe Maria Sciacca
 M. Portale, Scritti di Giuseppe Maria Sciacca

1912 births
1995 deaths
Academic staff of the University of Palermo
Kantian philosophers
20th-century Italian philosophers